Disco Six Six Six is a single and an EP by American post-hardcore band Girls Against Boys, released on October 1, 1996 by Touch and Go Records. "Disco Six Six Six" was the second single to promote House of GVSB, with "Super-fire" as the first. The public release had consisted of the title track in remastered form plus four additional songs. The four additional songs were not outtakes of House of GVSB, but were instead recorded after the album's sessions.

Track listing

Personnel 
Adapted from the Disco Six Six Six liner notes.

 Girls Against Boys
 Alexis Fleisig – drums
 Eli Janney – keyboards, bass guitar, backing vocals, engineering, mixing
 Scott McCloud – lead vocals, guitar
 Johnny Temple – bass guitar

Production and additional personnel
 Dom Barbera – additional mixing
 Greg Calbi – mastering
 Wayne Dorell – additional engineering
 Rich Lamb – additional engineering
 Ted Niceley – production
 Mike Rippe – engineering
 Ken Tondre – Roland TR-808

Release history

References

External links 
 

1996 EPs
Girls Against Boys albums
Touch and Go Records EPs
Albums produced by Ted Niceley